Alexander Scrymgeour may refer to:

 Alexander Scrymgeour, 12th Earl of Dundee (born 1949), Scottish peer and politician
 Alexander Scrymgeour (died 1306), Scottish knight who took part in the War of Scottish Independence